Silicothermic reactions are thermic chemical reactions using silicon as the reducing agent at high temperature (800-1400°C). The most prominent example is the Pidgeon process for reducing magnesium metal from ores. Other processes include the Bolzano process and the magnetherm process. All three are commercially used for magnesium production.

The silicothermic process for magnesium production was developed commercially in Canada during the Second World War by Lloyd Montgomery Pidgeon.

See also
Aluminothermic reaction
Calciothermic reaction

References

Metallurgy
Metallurgical processes
Inorganic reactions
Silicon